Fernando Nicolás Batiste (born March 11, 1984) is an Argentine footballer who plays for the Colombian Categoría Primera A club Union Magdalena.

He previously played for Bolivian clubs San José (2003–2006, 2008–2009) and Aurora (2007) and for Colombian clubs América de Cali (2009), Atlético Bucaramanga (2010), Fortaleza F.C. (2011), Itagüí Ditaires (2011–2012), Deportivo Pereira (2012, 2015–2017) and La Equidad 2013–2014).

References
 
 

1984 births
Living people
Argentine footballers
Association football midfielders
Club San José players
Club Aurora players
América de Cali footballers
Atlético Bucaramanga footballers
Fortaleza C.E.I.F. footballers
Águilas Doradas Rionegro players
Deportivo Pereira footballers
La Equidad footballers
Categoría Primera A players
Categoría Primera B players
Argentine expatriate footballers
Expatriate footballers in Bolivia
Expatriate footballers in Colombia
Sportspeople from Santa Fe Province